Route 238, consisting of State Route 238 (SR 238) and Interstate 238 (I-238), is a mostly north–south state and auxiliary Interstate highway in the San Francisco Bay Area of California. The southern segment is signed as SR 238 and is a divided multilane surface highway that runs parallel to the Hayward hills between I-680 in Fremont and I-580 in Castro Valley. The northern segment is signed as I-238 and is a six-lane freeway that runs more east–west between I-580 and I-880 in San Leandro.

The numbering of I-238 does not fit within the usual conventions of existing three-digit auxiliary Interstate Highways, where a single digit is prefixed to the two-digit number of its parent Interstate Highway because I-38 does not exist. The I-238 number was specifically requested by the state of California so it could match the California Streets and Highways Code and because all three-digit combinations of I-80 (the primary two-digit Interstate in the Bay Area) were already being used in the state.

Route description
Route 238 is part of the California Freeway and Expressway System and is part of the National Highway System, a network of highways that are considered essential to the country's economy, defense, and mobility by the Federal Highway Administration (FHWA).

SR 238
SR 238 runs from I-680 in Fremont to Union City, Hayward and I-580 in Castro Valley parallel to the Hayward hills. Until I-680 was completed in the area and supplanted it completely as a through route, SR 238 extended south to San Jose at its intersection with US Route 101 (US 101). Locally, it is designated Mission Boulevard from I-680 to the intersection with SR 92 and SR 185 (which continues as Mission Boulevard) in Hayward. It is designated as Foothill Boulevard in northern Hayward from A Street to I-580.

In Downtown Hayward immediately north of SR 92, northbound traffic continues along the original SR 238 alignment on Foothill Boulevard, while southbound traffic is diverted onto A Street and Mission Boulevard. This loop of one-way streets is known as the "Hayward Loop".

Mission Boulevard

Mission Boulevard, the former El Camino Viejo and El Camino Real, is the road that passes in front of Mission San José, the historic Spanish Mission founded in 1797, for which the road is named. Mission Boulevard proceeds in both directions from the Mission, but mainly northwest (the former El Camino Viejo) through Fremont, Union City, and Hayward. At the north end of Hayward, it changes its name to East 14th Street, which continues as a major thoroughfare going through San Leandro and Oakland. Since it runs along the base of the hills, Mission Boulevard nearly coincides with the Hayward Fault, a major earthquake fault, for almost the entire length of the Boulevard. The southern direction from the Mission San José is the former El Camino Real route to Mission Santa Clara de Asís.

Mission Boulevard joins the historic centers of the Mission San Jose and Niles districts of Fremont (formerly independent towns), the Decoto district of Union City (formerly an independent town), and Hayward.

I-238

Although the  I-238 goes in an east–west direction from Castro Valley to San Leandro, the California Department of Transportation (Caltrans) officially signs it as a north–south freeway since the rest of SR 238 is more north–south. The southern (geographically eastern) terminus of I-238 is at its interchange with I-580 and SR 238 in Castro Valley. From there, it enters into the southern portion of the census-designated place of Ashland, running parallel to its border with Cherryland. Then, after entering San Leandro, I-238 ends at its northern (geographically western) terminus with I-880.

I-238 numbering
I-238 does not follow established rules for numbering Interstates as there is no I-38. As it connects two auxiliary routes of I-80, it would normally use a three-digit number ending in 80, but, of the nine possible numbers, two (180 and 480) were in use by State Routes (the latter an Interstate until 1968 though SR 480 was deleted in 1991), and the remainder were already in use by other California auxiliary routes. (I-880 was designated at the same time as I-238.)

History

State Route 9

Before California massively renumbered its state highways in 1964, SR 238 was part of SR 9, which extended south to San Jose and Santa Cruz.

Canceled Foothill/Mission Freeway project
For several decades, SR 238 from I-680 in Fremont to Hayward was planned to be upgraded to a freeway, called the "Mission" or "Foothill" freeway. The segment was submitted to the Interstate Highway System in October 1968 but was rejected. Then, after years of various lawsuits and appeals, Caltrans decided to cancel the project in 2003 and sell off the property it had acquired in the name of eminent domain along the proposed route.

As an alternative, SR 238 was proposed to be expanded from two lanes in each direction to three lanes in each direction along the majority of its width. Various other improvements began in July 2010, followed by the California State Legislature relinquishing control of SR 238 within Hayward to local control in 2012. In March 2013, the routing in Downtown Hayward was changed to include a one way circulation known as the "Hayward Loop", designed to improve traffic flow between SR 238, SR 185, and SR 92.

I-238 segment
The section of road that is now I-238 had no signed number before the 1964 renumbering; it was pre-1964 Legislative Route 228 (along with an unbuilt extension west to unbuilt SR 61, which is still included in the SR 238 definition). The segment was then built as a freeway in 1956. 

When present, I-880 was added to the Interstate Highway System as a renumbering of part of SR 17, the short piece of SR 238 connecting I-880 to I-580 was also added; both were non-chargeable routes (not eligible for Interstate Completion funds). Both numbers—I-238 and I-880—were approved by the American Association of State Highway and Transportation Officials (AASHTO) on July 7, 1983. The interchanges with I-580 and I-880 were rebuilt from 1988 to 1994, in part to add missing ramps between I-238 and I-880 toward the south. Prior to the completion of the ramps, access was provided by Hesperian Boulevard.

On July 7, 1983, while approving the designation, AASHTO said:

On July 27, 1983, Caltrans responded:

With the decommissioning of SR 480 in 1991, the "480" designation was once again made available. However, there has been no push since then to renumber I-238 to I-480.

In September 2006, a project began to reconstruct the entire length of I-238, including a reconfigured interchange with I-880 and an added travel lane in each direction. Additionally, almost all of the bridges and overpasses were replaced with new ones meeting current earthquake resistance standards. The project was completed in October 2009, six months ahead of schedule.

Major intersections

See also

References

Further reading

External links

Caltrans: Route 238 highway conditions
California Highways: SR 238
I-238 California: Kurumi
California @ AARoads.com - Interstate 238
California @ AARoads.com - State Route 238
Indigestion 238: A history of the route and a full explanation of its numbering

38-2
38-2
238
38-2
238
State Route 238